The list of mountains in Strathcona Provincial Park lists all mountains in Strathcona Provincial Park recognized by name.  All of these mountains are part of the Vancouver Island Ranges.

Mountains of Strathcona Provincial Park 



0-9 
Peak 1805
Peak 1920
Peak 1909

A 
Abco Mountain
Mount Ablemarie
Mount Albert Edward
Argus Mountain
Augerpoint Mountain

B 
Mount Becher
The Behinde
Big Interior Mountain
Big Den Mountain
Black Cat Mountain
Mount Brooks
Mount Burman

C 
Castlecrag Mountain
Mount Celeste
Mount Cobb
Mount Colonel Foster
Mount Colwell
Comox Glacier
Mount Con Reid
Central Crags
Mount Crespi
Crest Mountain
Crown Mountain

D 
Mount DeVoe
Mount Donner
Mount Drabble

E 
Elkhorn Mountain

F 
Mount Filberg
Mount Flannigan
Mount Frink

G 
Mount George V
Golden Hinde
Mount Gore

H 
Mount Haig-Brown
Mount Harmston
Mount Heber
Horseshoe Mountain
Hygro Peak

I 
Iceberg Peak
Idsardi Mountain

J 
Jacklah Mountain
Jack's Fell
Mount Judson
Jutland Mountain

K 
Mount Kent-Urquhart
Kings Peak
Kookjai Mountain

L 
Mount Laing
Mount Lombard
Lone Wolf Mountain

M 
Marble Peak
Mariner Mountain
Matchlee Mountain
Megin Mountain
Mount McBride
The Misthorns
Mount Mitchell
Morrison Spire
Moyeha Mountain
M.S. Mountain
Mount Myra

N 
Nine Peaks

P 
El Piveto Mountain
Pearl Peak
Mount Phillips
Ptarmigan Pinnacles
Popsicle Peak
Pretty Girl Peak
Puzzle Mountain

Q 
Quatchka Ridge

R 
Rambler Peak
The Red Pillar
Mount Regan
Mount Rosseau
Mount Rufus

S 
Scimitar Peak
The Scissors
Mount Septimus
Shelbert Mountain
Shepherd Ridge
Sid Williams Peak
Siokum Mountain
Slocomb Peak
Splendor Mountain
Strata Mountain
Syd Watts Peak
Sydney Cone

T 
Mount Thelwood
Mount Titus
Mount Tom Taylor
Trio Mountain
Tyee Mountain
Tzela Mountain

U 
Ursus Mountain

V 
Victoria Peak
Volcano Peak

W 
Wolf Mountain

Sources

External links
Strathcona Provincial Park from British Columbia Ministry of Environment website

 

 
Strathcona Provincial Park